The Tornado is a water slide manufactured by ProSlide Technology. It requires riders to sit in a 2-6 seater round tube. Riders drop from inside a tunnel out into the ride's main element shaped like a funnel on its side. Riders oscillate from one side to the other until they exit through the back of the funnel and into a splash pool. Many of the slides feature a conveyor belt to bring the rafts to the top. On April 13, 2012 it was announced the first six-person Tornado would be built using Hydromagnetic technology.

Installations
The first Tornado slides opened at Mountain Creek Waterpark, Six Flags Hurricane Harbor: New England and Splashin' Safari in 2003. To this date, ProSlide has installed 97 Tornados.

Awards
  Zinga, Splashin' Safari, Best Waterpark Ride, 2003
 Super Tornado, Chimelong Paradise, International Best New Waterpark Ride, 2006
 Tornado slides have occasionally ranked in the Top 5 Waterpark Rides such as Zinga at Splashin' Safari
 Several other Tornado slides have ranked in the Top 5 New Waterpark Rides such as Funnel of Fear at WildWater Adventure

References

External links

 Official Tornado page

Tornado